Brainfever is a German heavy metal band from Cologne. The band was initially active in the 1970s, but reformed in 1983. The band reformed a second time in 2016. The band has released two full-length studio albums, Capture the Night in 1984 and Face to Face in 1986.

Members

Current lineup 

 Marco Bottcher - guitar
 Marc Simon - vocals
 Heinz Schreiber - bass
 Michael Jacobs - drums

Past members 

 Wollo Reddig - keyboards
 Eric Hirschhauser - drums
 Frank Marowsky - drums
 Horst Neumann - vocals

Discography 

 Capture the Night (1984, Mausoleum)
 Face to Face (1986, Bellaphon)
 You (1988, Steamhammer)

References

External links 
 Facebook
 Official website

German heavy metal musical groups
Musical groups from Cologne